Saukampen is a mountain in Lom Municipality in Innlandet county, Norway. The mountain is surrounded by several other notable mountains including Kvitingskjølen and Grjothovden to the west; Veslekjølen, Skarvhøi, and Ilvetjørnhøi to the northwest; Liaberget to the south; and Heranoshøi to the southwest.

See also
List of mountains of Norway

References

Lom, Norway
Mountains of Innlandet